Roger Allin (December 18, 1848 – January 1, 1936) was an American politician who was the fourth Governor of North Dakota from 1895 to 1897, and the second Lieutenant Governor of North Dakota from 1891 to 1893 serving under Governor Andrew H. Burke.

Biography
Allin was a native of Bradworthy, Devonshire, England. After his father died, he and his family moved to Ontario, Canada, where he was educated in the public schools. He married twice, first to Isabella McKensie on March 22, 1881, then to Anna McKensie (niece of Isabella) on May 1, 1918. He had one child.

Career
Allin served in the Dakota Territorial Council in 1887–1889 and as a delegate to the North Dakota 1889 Constitutional Convention. Allin was a member of the North Dakota Senate from 1889 through 1891; and then Lieutenant Governor as a Republican from 1891 through 1893. Elected by popular vote on November 6, 1894, he served as Governor through 1897. The effects of the Panic of 1893 were dealt with during his tenure. After losing a bid for reelection, he retired from politics and pursued his farming interests.

Death
Allin died on January 1, 1936, and is interred at Park River Memorial Park, Park River, North Dakota.

See also
List of U.S. state governors born outside the United States

References

External links
Biography for Roger Allin from the State Historical Society of North Dakota website
National Governors Association

Lieutenant Governors of North Dakota
Republican Party governors of North Dakota
Republican Party North Dakota state senators
Members of the Dakota Territorial Legislature
19th-century American politicians
1848 births
1936 deaths
People from Torridge District
English emigrants to the United States